James M. Wahl (Given name: Jens Magnus Wahl) (January 7, 1846 - February 9, 1939) was a pioneer Norwegian American settler in South Dakota. He served as the first legislator of Lincoln County, South Dakota in the Dakota Territorial Legislature. Wahl named the city of Canton, South Dakota.

Biography
Wahl was born at Storvahl in Nærøy parish,  Nord-Trøndelag, Norway. He was the son of  Fredrik Andreas Jenssen  (1814-1866) and Johanna Maria Mikkelsdatter (1825-1917).  Wahl emigrated to La Crosse, Wisconsin in 1867 from Nord-Trøndelag County, Norway. He attended West Salem Seminary in La Crosse, Wisconsin and upon completion moved to Sioux Falls, South Dakota. He served as a guide to immigrants coming to Lincoln County, South Dakota from Norway for many years. He later moved to the Sioux Valley arriving on April 23, 1868 in Canton, South Dakota. He filed for a homestead on the very piece of property on which the county courthouse stands today.

Among many contributions to the community, Wahl assisted with the organization of Bethlehem Lutheran church (now Canton Lutheran Church), organized bringing the Augustana College from Beloit, Iowa  to Sioux Falls, South Dakota and wrote a 277-page record of local settlement. He died in 1939,  a citizen of the United States for 73 years.

References

1846 births
1939 deaths
People from Nærøy
People from Canton, South Dakota
Politicians from La Crosse, Wisconsin
Members of the Dakota Territorial Legislature
19th-century American politicians
Norwegian emigrants to the United States
American Lutherans
American pioneers
Writers from South Dakota